Ham Lane railway station served the village of Kingston Seymour, Somerset, England, from 1897 to 1940 on the Weston, Clevedon and Portishead Railway.

History 
The station opened on 1 December 1897 by the Weston, Clevedon and Portishead Railway. It had a milk platform and a siding. The station closed on 20 May 1940.

References

External links 

Disused railway stations in Somerset
Railway stations in Great Britain opened in 1897
Railway stations in Great Britain closed in 1940
1897 establishments in England
1940 disestablishments in England